Magneto-inertial fusion (MIF) describes a class of fusion devices which combine aspects of magnetic confinement fusion and inertial confinement fusion in an attempt to lower the cost of fusion devices. MIF uses magnetic fields to confine an initial warm, low-density plasma, then compresses that plasma to fusion conditions using an impulsive driver or "liner."

Magneto-inertial fusion approaches differ in the degree of magnetic organization present in the initial target, as well as the nature and speed of the imploding liner. Laser, solid, liquid and plasma liners have all been proposed.

Magneto-inertial fusion begins with a warm dense plasma target containing a magnetic field. Plasma's conductivity prevents it from crossing magnetic field lines. As a result, compressing the target amplifies the magnetic field.
 Since the magnetic field reduces particle transport, the field insulates the target from the liner.

In popular fiction 
The starships in Mike Kupari's novel Her Brother's Keeper are propelled in part by magneto-inertial fusion rockets.

See also 
Inertial confinement fusion (ICF) 
Magnetized Liner Inertial Fusion 
Magnetized target fusion
Helion Energy
General Fusion

References 

Fusion power